Baitsi, formerly known as Baiti and previously as Beidi, is a district in the Pacific nation of Nauru. It belongs to Ubenide Constituency.

Geography

Location
The district is located in the northwest of the island. It covers an area of 1.2 km².

Former villages

See also
 Geography of Nauru
 List of settlements in Nauru

References

External links

Districts of Nauru
Populated places in Nauru